Premier Gaou is an album by Ivorian Zouglou artists Magic System.

It contains the eponymous hit single 1er Gaou, which sold 300,000 copies in France. The album was a hit in that country, and was certified Gold and signifying the breakthrough of indie group Magic System.

Track listing

References

1999 albums
Magic System albums